Logan Hanneman (born June 2, 1993) is an American cross-country skier. He competed in the 2018 Winter Olympics.

Cross-country skiing results
All results are sourced from the International Ski Federation (FIS).

Olympic Games

World Championships

World Cup

Season standings

References

1993 births
Living people
Cross-country skiers at the 2018 Winter Olympics
American male cross-country skiers
Tour de Ski skiers
Olympic cross-country skiers of the United States